The Arab Journalism Award (AJA) launched in 1999, by Dubai Press Club, The award is given each year by Sheikh Mohammed bin Rashid Al Maktoum during the Arab Media Forum. It plays a role in motivating Arab media and encouraged Arab journalists to adopt innovation and creativity to develop their work.
The award's main goal is to reward talent, inspire, and stimulate creativity. It is also aimed at enhancing the constructive role of the press in serving the community.

Categories 
Categories include :
 investigative reporting  
 young talent in journalism  
 photojournalism  
 economic journalism  
 outstanding cartoon artwork  
 sports journalism  
 best press interview  
 best columnist  
 media personality of the year  
 political journalism  
 cultural journalism  
 smart journalism
 humanitarian journalism.

winners
 Omaya Joha

References

Awards established in 1999
Journalism awards
Emirati literary awards
Mass media in the United Arab Emirates
1999 establishments in the United Arab Emirates